Masamoto (written: ,  or ) is a masculine Japanese given name. Notable people with the name include:

, Japanese daimyō
, Japanese daimyō
, Japanese kugyō
, Japanese businessman

Japanese masculine given names